Section 1 of the Internal Revenue Code ( or simply IRC §1), titled "Tax Imposed" is the law that imposes a federal income tax on taxable income, and sets forth the amount of the tax to be paid. A similar tax on corporations is set forth in IRC §11.

Within the layout of the IRC, this section appears as follows:

Subtitle A Income Taxes (§§ 1–1563)
Chapter 1 Normal Taxes and Surtaxes (§§ 1–1400T)
Subchapter A Determination of Tax Liability (§§ 1–59A)
Part I Tax on Individuals (§§ 1–5)
 Section 1 Tax imposed

Basic provisions of section 1

Section 1 imposes the Federal income tax on the "taxable income" of individuals (mainly in subsections (a) through (d)) and on the taxable income of certain estates and trusts (subsection e).

For individuals, section 1 divides income earners into categories depending on whether they are married individuals filing jointly, married individuals filing separately, unmarried individuals, surviving spouses, or heads of households.  Section 1 sets forth the formula for what amount of taxable income must be paid to the United States.

As currently worded (in mid-2006), subsections (a) through (d) actually list the tax rate schedules for the year 1993. Based in part on the provisions of subsections (f) and (i), the tax rate schedules for 1994 and subsequent years (reflecting, among other things, tax rate changes and cost of living adjustments) are promulgated by the Internal Revenue Service. In other words, the official tax rate schedules for years 1994 and thereafter are not found in the text of section 1 itself.

Example of tax rate schedule for year 1993 for "head of household"

For example, for the year 1993, §1(b) states:

(b) Heads of households

There is hereby imposed on the taxable income of every head of a household (as defined in section 2 (b)) a tax determined in accordance with the following table: 
  

People meeting the description of a "head of a household" with a taxable income of $50,000 for the year 1993 would have looked to the table to see that their income falls within the category of persons earning "Over $29,600 but not over $76,400". The tax would be:

$4,440, plus 28% of the excess over $29,600

which is equal to

$4,440, plus 28% of ($50,000 $29,600)

$50,000 minus $29,600 equals $20,400, and 28% of $20,400 is $5,712, so the total tax due on an income of $50,000 would be ($4,400 + $5,712), for a final total of $10,152. By comparison, a person realizing one million dollars of taxable income would have been assessed $374,485 for the same period ($77,485 + 39.6% ($1,000,000–$250,000)). A base of $50,000 taxable income would thus yield an after-tax income of $39,848, while a base $1,000,000 income would yield an after-tax income of
$625,515.

These figures, however, do not account for a number of important variables. For example, the tax applies only to taxable income, which is defined in IRC §63 as gross income minus allowable deductions to gross income, personal exemptions, and either the standard deduction or itemized deductions.  Gross income, in turn, is defined in IRC §61. Since taxpayers may make a variety of deductions, such as the deduction for selling a piece of property at a loss allowed under IRC §165, a taxpayer's gross income will be higher than his taxable income.

Example of tax rate schedule for year 2006 for "head of household"

Based on the cost of living adjustment and tax rate change provisions of section 1, the same schedule for a "head of household" for the year 2006 (i.e., for tax returns due April 15, 2007) is as follows:

 

Source: Internal Revenue Service, Publication 1796 (Rev. Feb. 2006).

Using the same calculations as in the section above, a $50,000 earner would pay $7,857.50 in income tax as of 2006, a reduction of $2,294.50; the $1,000,000 earner would pay $326,864, a reduction of $47,621.

Income taxation of estates and trusts

By contrast, the 2005 tax rate schedule for estates and trusts (not found in the text of the statute, but in IRS publications), provides for relatively high marginal tax rates on relatively low levels of income:

Source, Internal Revenue Service, Year 2005 Instructions for Form 1041, U.S. Income Tax Return for Estates and Trusts, at page 23.

Changes to the tax code are frequently aimed at the provisions of IRC §1, with adjustments being made to the percentage of income taxed in each category, and the dollar amounts which trigger a higher level of taxation.

0001